Wingate may refer to:

Places

New Zealand
 Wingate, New Zealand, a suburb of Lower Hutt

United Kingdom
 Wingate, County Durham
 Wingate Quarry,  a Site of Special Scientific Interest in County Durham
 Old Wingate, County Durham
 Wingates, Bolton, Greater Manchester
Wingate offshore gas field, North Sea

United States
 Wingate, Indiana
 Wingate, Kansas
 Wingate, Missouri
 Wingate, Brooklyn, New York
 Wingate, North Carolina
 Wingate, Maryland
 Wingate, Pennsylvania
 Wingate Sandstone, a geologic formation across the Colorado Plateau
 Wingate, Texas
 Fort Wingate, New Mexico

People
 Wingate (surname), a surname (including a list of people with the name)

People with the given name
 Wingate Hayes (1823–1877), American politician and District Attorney from Rhode Island 
 Wingate H. Lucas (1908–1989), American politician from Texas

Organizations
 Wingate & Finchley F.C., London-based football club  
 Wingate By Wyndham, a hotel chain under Wyndham Hotels & Resorts
 Wingate Institute, a sports training facility in Israel

Education
 Wingate University, a private university in Wingate, North Carolina

Other usages
 WinGate, computer software providing an integrated gateway management system for Microsoft Windows
 Wingate Memorial Trophy, U.S. Intercollegiate Lacrosse Association (USILA) national college lacrosse title from 1934 through 1970.
 Wingate Prize, a Jewish book award
 Wingate test, a cycle ergometer test